Daniel Richardson (January 25, 1863 – September 15, 1926) was an American second baseman in professional baseball. He played in Major League Baseball for the New York Giants (NL), New York Giants (PL), Washington Senators, Brooklyn Grooms, and Louisville Colonels from 1884 to 1894.

See also
List of Major League Baseball single-game hits leaders
List of Major League Baseball player-managers

External links

1863 births
1926 deaths
19th-century baseball players
Major League Baseball player-managers
Major League Baseball second basemen
New York Giants (NL) players
New York Giants (PL) players
Washington Senators (1891–1899) players
Brooklyn Grooms players
Louisville Colonels players
New York Gothams players
Hamilton Blackbirds players
Washington Senators (1891–1899) managers
Washington Senators (NL) managers
Baseball players from New York (state)
Sportspeople from Elmira, New York